The International Romani Union, formerly known as the International Gypsy Committee and International Rom Committee, is an organization active for the rights of the Romani people. Its seat is in Vienna. The International Romani Union also has offices in Skopje, North Macedonia, and Washington, D.C., USA.

The IRU was established at the second World Romani Congress in 1978. Its presidents have included Stanislav Stankiewicz, Emil Ščuka, and before him, Rajko Đurić, who held this office for many years. The current President of the IRU is Mr. Zoran Dimov, who was elected during the 10th Congress which was held on 18–20 March 2016 in Skopje, Macedonia. Was attended by 100 delegates and members of the IRU from 40 countries, Zoran Dimov was elected to be the President of the IRU. After that, a new leadership of the IRU Parliament chaired by the past head of Parliament Stevo Balogh from Austria was elected.

The IRU has a CONSULTATIVE ECOSOC Status within the UN.

History
In 1959, Ionel Rotaru founded the World Gypsy Community (CMG) in France. While members were mostly French, the organization made contacts in Poland, Canada, Turkey, and other countries. When the French government dissolved the CMG in 1965, a breakaway group formed the International Gypsy Committee (IGC) under the leadership of Vanko Rouda. When the 1971 World Romani Congress adopted the self-appellation of "Roma" rather than gypsy, the IGC was renamed the Komiteto Lumniako Romano (International Rom Committee or IRC), and Rouda was re-confirmed as president. The Committee became a member of the Council of Europe the following year. The Committee has changed again at the 1978 World Romani Congress and given its present name. It was given consultative status at the United Nations Economic and Social Council the following year. The Union became a registered NGO with UNICEF in 1986. In 1993, it was promoted to Category II, Special Consultative Status at the United Nations.

Structure

The IRU consists of four bodies: Congress, Parliament, Presidium, and Court of Justice.

Institutional links

The IRU has institutional links with: - the Council of Europe. - OSCE (ODHIR). - UNHCHR. - UNO - ERTF.  The IRU has a memorandum of understanding with many other countries with a view to the "continuous improvement of the situation and living conditions of the Roma.

See also
International Romani Day
Romani People
Romani Language
Romani diaspora 
Flag of Romani people

References

Further reading 

 In: Burszta, Wojciech, Tomasz Kamusella and Sebastian Wojciechowski, eds. Nationalismus Across the Globe: An Overview of the Nationalism of State-endowed and Stateless Nations. Poznan: School of Humanities and Journalism, pp. 433–455.
 Timeline of Romani History - Patrin
[PDF] Micmacs and Gypsies: Occupation of the Peripatetic Niche | Semantic Scholar
Parsis Relations to roma  Parsis of India /Zoroastrians

External links
Official website

International political organizations
Organisations based in Vienna
Romani
Romani political parties